Frank Bogart Bridges Sr. (July 4, 1890 – June 10, 1970) was an American football, basketball, and baseball coach. He served as the head football coach at Baylor University from 1920 to 1925, Simmons University—now known as Hardin–Simmons University—from 1927 to 1929, and St. Mary's University in San Antonio, Texas from 1935 to 1939. Bridges was also the head basketball coach at Baylor from 1920 to 1926, at Simmons from 1927 to 1929, and at St. Mary's from 1935 to 1939, tallying a career college basketball mark of 102–137. In addition, he was Baylor's head baseball coach from 1920 to 1927, amassing a record of 95–73, and the head baseball coach at St. Mary's in 1938. 1944, Bridges served as the co-head coach with Pete Cawthon and Ed Kubale for the Brooklyn Tigers of the National Football League (NFL). He graduated from Harvard University.

Coaching career
Bridges coached high school football in Fort Smith, Arkansas. During his tenure as head football coach at Baylor University, Bridges compiled a 35–18–6 record. His winning percentage of .644 ranks third in school history, behind R. H. Hamilton (.786) and Bob Woodruff (.645). In 1921 and 1922, he led the Bears to consecutive eight-win seasons. Bridges won the school's first two Southwest Conference championships, in 1922 and 1924. Baylor did not win another until 1974.  From 1927 to 1929, he coached at Hardin–Simmons University where he posted a 16–13–4 record.

Death
Bridges died on June 10, 1970, at a nursing home in San Antonio.

Head coaching record

College football

College basketball

College baseball

References

1890 births
1970 deaths
Basketball coaches from Georgia (U.S. state)
Baylor Bears athletic directors
Baylor Bears baseball coaches
Baylor Bears football coaches
Baylor Bears men's basketball coaches
Brooklyn Tigers coaches
Brooklyn Dodgers (NFL) coaches
Chicago White Sox scouts
Hardin–Simmons Cowboys basketball coaches
Hardin–Simmons Cowboys football coaches
St. Mary's Rattlers baseball coaches
St. Mary's Rattlers football coaches
St. Mary's Rattlers men's basketball coaches
High school football coaches in Arkansas
Harvard University alumni
Sportspeople from Savannah, Georgia
Sportspeople from Waco, Texas